Irma Cué Sarquis (born May 7, 1938), also known by her married name, Irma Cué de Duarte, is a Mexican lawyer and politician of the Institutional Revolutionary Party (PRI).

Early life and education
Irma Cué Sarquis was born in Tierra Blanca, Veracruz on May 7, 1938. She completed her basic studies there, and subsequently attended high school in Orizaba and preparatory in Mexico City. From 1955 to 1959, she studied for a licentiate in law at the National Autonomous University of Mexico (UNAM), graduating on October 1, 1964 with the thesis Algunas consideraciones sobre el juicio de amparo (Some Considerations on the Amparo Trial).

She was Chair of Commercial Law of UNAM's School of Commerce and Administration in 1959.

Public career
Cué began her professional career as an agent of the Public Ministry from 1960 to 1961. From 1967 to 1974, she was assistant to the Director General of Tax Studies of the Secretariat of Finance and Public Credit. At this time she began her friendship with Miguel de la Madrid, who would later be President of Mexico. From 1974 to 1976 she served as Director of Legal Consulting of the National Council of Science and Technology (CONACYT), and from 1977 to 1982 she was General Legal Director of the General Coordination of Administrative Studies of the Presidency of the Republic.

In 1982, Cué was the PRI candidate for federal deputy for the 12th District of Veracruz. She was elected to the 52nd Legislature, and held the secretariat of the Programming and Budget Commission. She was appointed President of the Chamber of Deputies for the month of September 1983, coinciding with the response to the first government report of President Miguel de la Madrid.

She left the general secretariat in 1987 when she moved to the general legal subdirectorate of the Institute for Social Security and Services for State Workers (ISSSTE).

On October 28, 1987, she was appointed  of the National Supreme Court of Justice at the nomination of Miguel de la Madrid, assigned to the Auxiliary Chamber.

Subsequently, Cué held advisory positions at several public institutions, such as Pemex and ISSSTE. She retired from professional practice until March 22, 2016, when it was announced that she had been nominated by the PRI as the top candidate for deputy to the Constituent Assembly of Mexico City.

Awards and recognitions
 1980 – Research Award from the President of the Republic
 1981 – Prize of Merit in Public Administration from the National Association of Lawyers
 1982 – Second place for the National Public Administration Prize
 1987 – Prize of Legislative Merit and Forum Prize of Mexico from the National Association of Lawyers
 2017 – General Lázaro Cárdenas del Río Prize for Democratic Merit from the PRI

Publications
 La empresa pública en México (1970)
 Regulación Constitucional de las empresas públicas (1980)
 Control Legislativo de las Empresas (1981)
 La Suprema Corte de Justicia de la Nación: propuesta legislativa de reorganización (1984)
 Formulación de políticas para incrementar la participación de la mujer en la administración pública (1990),

References

1938 births
20th-century Mexican lawyers
21st-century Mexican lawyers
Female justice ministers
Institutional Revolutionary Party politicians
Living people
Members of the Constituent Assembly of Mexico City
Mexican women lawyers
National Autonomous University of Mexico alumni
Academic staff of the National Autonomous University of Mexico
Politicians from Veracruz
People from Tierra Blanca, Veracruz
Presidents of the Chamber of Deputies (Mexico)
Women members of the Chamber of Deputies (Mexico)
20th-century women lawyers
21st-century women lawyers
Women legislative speakers